Burt Duward Cady (July 25, 1874 – July 24, 1952) was an American politician from the state of Michigan.

Biography 
Cady was born in Port Huron, St. Clair County, Michigan, July 25, 1874 where he would reside and become a lawyer. He was a member of Michigan State Senate 11th District, 1907–1908.  He was a delegate to Republican National Convention from Michigan, 1916 (alternate), 1920, and 1928 (alternate).  Cady was Chairman of the Michigan Republican Party, 1919–1925. He died at Port Huron on July 24, 1952.

References 

1874 births
1952 deaths
Michigan lawyers
Michigan Republican Party chairs
Republican Party Michigan state senators
People from Port Huron, Michigan
20th-century American politicians